David Gracie (26 January 1927 – 26 October 2020) was a British hurdler. He competed in the men's 400 metres hurdles at the 1952 Summer Olympics. Gracie died in October 2020 at the age of 93.

References

External links
 

1927 births
2020 deaths
Athletes (track and field) at the 1952 Summer Olympics
British male hurdlers
Olympic athletes of Great Britain